People's Assembly may refer to:

Parliaments and legislatures 
 People's Assembly (Albania), former name of the parliament of the Republic of Albania
 People's Assembly (Burma), the former unicameral legislature of socialist-era Burma
 Egypt's House of Representatives was known as the People's Assembly when it was part of the country's former bicameral parliament 
 People's Assembly of Abkhazia, the legislature of Abkhazia

 People's National Assembly, the lower house of the Algerian Parliament
 Supreme People's Assembly, parliament of the Democratic People's Republic of Korea (North Korea)
 Assembly of the People (comitia populi tributa), a legislative assembly of the ancient Roman Republic
 People's Assembly of Seychelles, the legislature of Seychelles between 1979 and 1993
 People's Assembly of Syria, the legislative authority of Syria

Other organizations 
 People's Assembly (Uruguay), a socialist electoral coalition in Uruguay
 Peoples assemblies, gatherings called to address issues by direct democracy
 People's Assembly Against Austerity, a political initiative in the United Kingdom
 United Nations People's Assembly, a proposed addition to the United Nations System

See also 
 Roman assemblies, legislative institutions in ancient Rome
 Citizens' assembly, a body formed from the citizens of a modern state to deliberate on an issue
 National People's Assembly (disambiguation)
 Popular assembly (disambiguation)